Marco Pereira (born 1950) is a Brazilian classical guitarist. He was born in São Paulo and took lessons from Isaias Savio, an important Uruguayan guitarist and teacher who brought Miguel Llobet's technique to Brazil. Pereira obtained his master's degree at the University of Paris-Sorbonne; his thesis was titled  Heitor Villa-Lobos and His Work for Guitar.  He teaches harmony, composition arranging, and improvisation at the Federal University of Rio de Janeiro (UFRJ).
Pereira has released several solo CDs, including Dança dos Quatro Ventos (GHA Belgium), Elegia (Channel Classics - Netherlands),Brasil Musical (Tom Brasil - Brazil), Valsas Brasileiras (Garbolights - Brazil), Luz das Cordas  (Garbolights - Brazil), O Samba da Minha Terra (Garbolights - Brazil), Camerístico (Garbolights - Brazil), and Cristal (Garbolights - Brazil), Original (Guitar Solo Publications, San Francisco), "Stella del Matino" (EGEA, Perugia, Italy) and "Essence" (Kind of Blue, Lugano, Switzerland). His compositions were issued by the publishers Éditions Lémoine of Paris and Guitar Solo Publications of San Francisco.

His instructional publications include Ritmos Brasileiros (Brazilian Rhythms), Cadernos de Harmonia(Harmony Method for Guitar), Brazilian Seven String' Guitar - Technique and Style, Cristal and Valsas Brasileiras.

His compositions and books are edited by Éditions Lemoine (Paris), Guitar Solo Publications (San Francisco) Editora Musimed (Brasília), and Garbolights Produções Artísticas Ltda. (Rio de Janeiro),

Awards
He has won important prizes in international guitar competitions such as Concurso Andrés Segóvia (Palma de Mallorca) and Concurso Francisco Tárrega (Valencia). In Brazil he won the Brazilian Sharp Award for Best Soloist and for Best Album of the Year (1994). He also received an award for best arranger for the album Gal, by Gal Costa.

Discography
Cristal
Cameristico (guitar and orchestra)
O Samba da Minha Terra
Original
Afinidade
Valsas Brasileiras
Luz das Cordas
Violão Popular Brasileiro Contemporaneo
Circulo das Cordas
Dança dos Quatro Ventos
Elegia
Bons Encontros
Brasil Musical

Books
Cadernos de Harmonia
Cristal
Ritmos Brasileiros (Brazilian Rhythms)
Valsas Brasileiras (Brazilian Waltzes)
Heitor Villa-Lobos and His Work for Guitar
Sete Cordas, Técnica e Estilo (Seven String Guitar, Technique and Style)

References

External links
Official Website
[editor
[store

Brazilian classical guitarists
Brazilian male guitarists
University of Paris alumni
Musicians from São Paulo
1950 births
Living people
Academic staff of the Federal University of Rio de Janeiro